Good Riddance is the debut studio album by American singer-songwriter Gracie Abrams. It was released on February 24, 2023, through Interscope Records. The album was written by Abrams, with Aaron Dessner also having writing and producing credits on all songs.

Background 
On January 9, 2023, Abrams announced her debut album, Good Riddance, to be released on February 24, 2023. The second single, titled "Where do we go now?", was released on January 13. The third single, titled "Amelie", was released on February 10.

Tour 
Abrams will embark on the Good Riddance Tour, her third headlining concert tour. It covers North America and Europe for 35 dates. It will start on March 6, 2023, in Chicago, and conclude on October 16, in Zürich.

Track listing 
All songs are written by Gracie Abrams and Aaron Dessner, and produced by Dessner, except where noted. All songs stylized in sentence case.

Personnel 
Credits are adapted from the album's liner notes and Tidal.

Musicians 

 Gracie Abrams – lead vocals (all tracks), songwriting (all tracks), electric piano (10)
 Aaron Dessner – production (all tracks), songwriting (all tracks), acoustic guitar (1, 7–10), baritone guitar (11), bass (3, 5–6, 8–10, 12), cymbals (1), drum programming (2, 4–6, 11–12), electric bass (1), electric guitar (1–5, 8–9, 11), guitar (1, 5, 9–10), mellotron (1–2, 6, 11), ophicleide (4), percussion (1, 4–6), piano (1–2, 4, 8–9, 11–12), shaker (3, 10), synth bass (1–2, 4, 6, 11), synthesizer (1–6, 8–12), tambourine (1), electric piano (2–3, 9–10, 12)
 Brian Eno – production (12)
 Matias Tellez – production (2, 4)
 Jonathan Low – mixing (all tracks), synth bass (8)
 James McAlister – drums (4–7, 9), drum programming (8), electric guitar (2–3, 5), guitar (5), keyboard (1–5, 9), marachas (9), moog bass (2, 5–7, 9–10), percussion (8, 11–12), piano (7), shaker (6), synthesizer (2–12), tambourine (3, 9)
 Rob Moose – orchestration (4), piano (4), viola (4, 11), violin (4, 11)
 Thomas Bartlett – piano (all tracks), synthesizer (all tracks), mellotron (1–6, 8, 11), ophicleide (8) electric piano (1–5, 7–8, 11)
 Ben Lanz – synthesizer (1, 4–6, 8, 11–12)
 Matt Barrick – drums (1, 3, 9) percussion (2–3, 9)
 James Krivchenia – drums (2–3, 5), percussion (5)
 Bryce Dessner – electric guitar (2–3)
 Bryan Devendorf – drums (8)

Charts

Release history

References 

2023 debut albums
Gracie Abrams albums
Interscope Records albums